During the Roman Republic, moneyers were called tresviri aere argento auro flando feriundo, literally "three men for casting (and) striking bronze, silver (and) gold (coins)". This was a board of the college of the vigintiviri, or Board of twenty (later briefly the Board of twenty-six), vigintisexviri. The title was abbreviated III. VIR. AAAFF. or even III. VIR. A.P.F. (tresviri ad pecuniam feriundam) on the coinage itself. These men were collectively known as the tresviri monetales or sometimes, less correctly, as the triumviri monetales. The singular is triumvir monetalis. In English, they are most correctly called mint magistrates, since 'moneyers' may imply that they actually struck the coins themselves.

In the early times of the Republic, there are few records of any officers who were charged with the superintendence of the mint, and there is little respecting the introduction of such officers apart from a very vague statement from Pomponius. It was thought by Niebuhr that they were introduced at the time when the Romans first began to coin silver, in 269 BC, but modern authors consider this too precise a reading of Pomponius. It is known that a college of three was in existence c. 150 BC. A fourth magistrate was briefly added by Julius Caesar in 44 BC during a time when the mint output was particularly large (in preparation for a war against Parthia).

These magistrates were responsible for the production of the Roman coinage. They were not simple mint workers (monetarii), they were officials who controlled the process, including the design on the coins themselves. Membership in the vigintisexvirate was for most of them the first step on the cursus honorum, the age when the post could be held appears to have been approximately 30, although some held it at a greater age and there is some evidence that the position was appointed rather than elected.

Some coins appear to have been special issues bearing the legend S C or EX S. C. (ex senatus consulto). Some of these special issues do not bear the signature of a triumvir monetalis, but the inscription CVR. X. FL. i. e. curator denariorum flandorum, or are signed by praetors (P), aediles (CVR AED), or quaestors (Q). During the Roman Empire, this appears on the bronze coinage only (except during the first few years of hero's reign, when it is also found on the precious metal coinage), and it suggests that although the emperor kept the minting of gold and silver coins under his own authority, the Senate, as a sop to its pride, was allowed to retain nominal authority over bronze coinage.

In any case, the magistrate's control of the legend on the coinage lent itself to the production of coins often containing propagandistic political messaging. This served as self-advertising to further the potential political careers of the moneyers themselves, their families or that of their patrons.

List of moneyers 
This article incorporates text from Smith 1875, which is in the public domain.

Legend:

RRC #: Designation in Michael Crawford's Roman Republic Coinage (1974)
Babelon #: Designation in Ernest Babelon's Monnaies de la Republique Romaine (1885)
Career highlight: Highest known office held by moneyer
Leg.: Legate
Tr. Pl.: Tribune of the plebs
Q.: Quaestor
Pr.: Praetor
Propr.: Propraetor
Cos: Consul
Cos.Suff: Suffect consul
Cos desig.: Consul designate
Procos.: Proconsul
Pont.: Pontiff
Rex.Sacr.; Rex Sacrorum
Praef: Prefect

211-188 BC: First Denarii to the Peace of Apamea

188-146 BC: Peace of Apamea - Sack of Carthage and Corinth

145-106 BC: To Marius' first consulate

106-92 BC: Marius' consulates to the Social War

92-79 BC: Social war through Sulla's dictatorship 
{| class="wikitable" <hiddentext>generated with :de:Wikipedia:Helferlein/VBA-Macro for EXCEL tableconversion V14<\hiddentext>
|-   valign="bottom"
| width="40" Height="12.75" |RRC #
| width="100" |Babelon #
| width="210" |Inscription
| width="30" |Start
| width="30" |End
| width="230" |Moneyer
| width="120" |Career Highlight
|-   valign="bottom"
| Height="12.75" | 337
 | Iunia 15-21, 23
 | D.SILANVS L.F
 | 91
 | 91
 | D. Iunius L.f. Silanus
 | ?
|-   valign="bottom"
| Height="12.75" | 340
 | Calpurnia 6-16, 18-21
 | L.PISO FRVGI
 | 90
 | 90
 | L. Calpurnius L.f. L.n. Piso Frugi
 | Tr. Pl. 89, Pr. 74
|-   valign="bottom"
| Height="12.75" | 341
 | Titia 1-7
 | Q.TITI
 | 90
 | 90
 | Q. Titius Mutto
 | ?
|-   valign="bottom"
| Height="12.75" | 342
 | Vibia 1-15
 | C.VIBIVS C.F PANSA
 | 90
 | 90
 | C. Vibius C.f. Pansa
 | The father of the Cos. 43 BC
|-   valign="bottom"
| Height="12.75" | 343
 | Porcia 5-7
 | M.CATO
 | 89
 | 89
 | M. Porcius Cato
 | ?
|-   valign="bottom"
| Height="12.75" | 344
 | Tituria 1-7, Turillia 1-2
 | L.TITVRI L.F SABIN
 | 89
 | 89
 | L. Titurius L.f. Sabinus
 | Leg. 75
|-   valign="bottom"
| Height="12.75" | 345
 | Cornelia 50-53
 | CN.LENTVL
 | 88
 | 88
 | Cn. Cornelius Cn.f. Lentulus Clodianus
 | Cos. 72
|-   valign="bottom"
| Height="12.75" | 346
 | Marcia 18-23
 | C.CENSORIN
 | 88
 | 88
 | C. Marcius Censorinus
 | Leg. 82
|-   valign="bottom"
| Height="12.75" | 347
 | N/A
 | M.FONTEIUS
 | ?
 | 87
 | M. Fonteius
 | Q. 84, Pr. 75
|-   valign="bottom"
| Height="12.75" | 348
 | Rubria 1-6, 8
 | L.RVBRI DOSSENI
 | 87
 | 87
 | L. Rubrius Dossenus
 | Probably the father of the Tr. Pl. ca. 49 BC L. Rubrius
|-   valign="bottom"
| Height="12.75" | 349
 | Memmia 8
 | L.C.MEMIES L.F GAL
 | 87
 | 87
 | L. Memmius L.f. Gal.
 | ?
|-   valign="bottom"
| Height="12.75" | 349
 | Memmia 8
 | L.C.MEMIES L.F GAL
 | 87
 | 87
 | C. Memmius L.f. Gal.
 | ?
|-   valign="bottom"
| Height="12.75" | 350A
 | Gargonia 1-5
 | GAR
 | 86
 | 86
 | C. Gargonius
 | ?
|-   valign="bottom"
| Height="12.75" | 350A
 | Ogulnia 1-3, 5-12
 | OGVL
 | 86
 | 86
 | Ogulnius
 | ?
|-   valign="bottom"
| Height="12.75" | 350A
 | Vergilia 1, 3-12
 | VER
 | 86
 | 86
 | M. Vergilius or Verginius
 | Tr. Pl. 87
|-   valign="bottom"
| Height="12.75" | 351
 | Fannia 4
 | M.FAN
 | 86
 | 86
 | M. Fannius
 | Aed. Pl. 86, Pr. 80
|-   valign="bottom"
| Height="12.75" | 351
 | Critonia 1
 | L.CRIT
 | 86
 | 86
 | L. Critonius
 | Aed. Pl. 86
|-   valign="bottom"
| Height="12.75" | 352
 | Julia 5-7
 | L.IVLI BVRSIO
 | 85
 | 85
 | L. Iulius Bursio
 | ?
|-   valign="bottom"
| Height="12.75" | 353
 | Fonteia 9-12, 14
 | MN.FONTEI C.F
 | 85
 | 85
 | Mn. Fonteius C.f.
 | ?
|-   valign="bottom"
| Height="12.75" | 354
 | Licinia 16,17
 | C.LICINIVS L.F MACER
 | 84
 | 84
 | C. Licinius L.f. Macer
 | Tr. Pl. 73, Pr. ?68
|-   valign="bottom"
| Height="12.75" | 355
 | Cassia 5
 | C.CASSIVS
 | 84
 | 84
 | C. Cassius Longinus
 | Cos. 73
|-   valign="bottom"
| Height="12.75" | 355
 | Julia 8
 | L.SALINAT
 | 84
 | 84
 | Livius Salinator
 | Leg. of Sertorius 81
|-   valign="bottom"
| Height="12.75" | 356
 | Furia 19,20
 | P.FORIVS CRASSIPES AED.CVR
 | 84
 | 84
 | P. Furius Crassipes
 | Aed. Cur. 84
|-   valign="bottom"
| Height="12.75" | 357
 | Norbana 1-2
 | C.NORBANVS
 | 83
 | 83
 | C. Norbanus C.f.
 | ?
|-   valign="bottom"
| Height="12.75" | 358
 | N/A
 | LATERENS
 | 83
 | 83
 | Mn. Iuventius L.f. Laterensis
 | Probably the father of Pr. 51
|-   valign="bottom"
| Height="12.75" | 359
 | Cornelia 28-30
 | L.SVLLA IMPER.ITERVM
 | 84
 | 83
 | L. Cornelius L.f. P.n. Sulla Felix
 | Cos. I 88, II 80
|-   valign="bottom"
| Height="12.75" | 360
 | Crepusia 2-3
 | P.CREPVSI
 | 82
 | 82
 | P. Crepusius
 | ?
|-   valign="bottom"
| Height="12.75" | 360
 | Mamilia 7-9
 | C.LIMETAN
 | 82
 | 82
 | C. Mamilius C.f. Limetanus
 | ?
|-   valign="bottom"
| Height="12.75" | 360
 | Marcia 25-27
 | L.CENSORIN
 | 82
 | 82
 | L. Marcius Censorinus
 | ?
|-   valign="bottom"
| Height="12.75" | 361
 | Crepusia 1
 | P.CREPVSI
 | 82
 | 82
 | P. Crepusius
 | ?
|-   valign="bottom"
| Height="12.75" | 362
 | Mamilia 6
 | C.MAMIL LIMETANUS C.F
 | 82
 | 82
 | C. Mamilius C.f. Limetanus
 | ?
|-   valign="bottom"
| Height="12.75" | 363
 | Marcia 24
 | L.CENSORIN
 | 82
 | 82
 | L. Marcius Censorinus
 | ?
|-   valign="bottom"
| Height="12.75" | 364
 | Antonia 1
 | Q.ANTO BALB PR
 | 83
 | 82
 | Q. Antonius Balbus
 | Pr. 82
|-   valign="bottom"
| Height="12.75" | 365
 | Valeria 12
 | C.VAL FLA IMPERAT
 | 82
 | 82
 | C. Valerius C.f. L.n. Flaccus
 | Procos. 82 transalpine Gaul, Cos. 93
|-   valign="bottom"
| Height="12.75" | 366
 | Annia 1-5
 | C.ANNIVS T.F T.N PRO.COS
 | 82
 | 81
 | C. Annius T.f. T.n. (Luscus)
 | Procos. 82, Spain
|-   valign="bottom"
| Height="12.75" | 366
 | Fabia 17
 | L.FABI L.F HISP Q
 | 82
 | 81
 | L. Fabius L.f. Hispaniensis
 | Q. 82, Spain
|-   valign="bottom"
| Height="12.75" | 366
 | Tarquitia 1
 | C.TARQVITI P.F Q
 | 82
 | 81
 | C. Tarquitius P.f.
 | Q. 82, Spain
|-   valign="bottom"
| Height="12.75" | 367
 | Cornelia 38-43
 | L.SVLLA IMPE
 | 84
 | 83
 | L. Cornelius L.f. P.n. Sulla Felix
 | Cos. I 88, II 80
|-   valign="bottom"
| Height="12.75" | 367
 | Manlia 3-8
 | L.MANLI PRO Q
 | 82
 | 82
 | L. Manlius L.f. Torquatus
 | ProQ. 82, Cos. 65
|-   valign="bottom"
| Height="12.75" | 368
 | Cornelia 34
 | L.SVLLA IMPE
 | 84
 | 83
 | L. Cornelius L.f. P.n. Sulla Felix
 | Cos. I 88, II 80
|-   valign="bottom"
| Height="12.75" | 369
 | Caecilia 30
 | M. METELLVS.Q.F
 | 82
 | 80
 | M. Caecilius Q.f. L.n. Metellus Pius
 | ?
|-   valign="bottom"
| Height="12.75" | 370
 | Servilia 7
 | C.SERVEIL
 | 82
 | 80
 | C. Servilius
 | ?
|-   valign="bottom"
| Height="12.75" | 371
 | Fabia 6
 | Q.MAX
 | 82
 | 80
 | Q. Fabius Maximus
 | ?
|-   valign="bottom"
| Height="12.75" | 372
 | Postumia 7,8
 | A.POST A.F S.N ALBIN
 | 81
 | 81
 | A. Postumius A.f. Sp.n. Albinus
 | ?
|-   valign="bottom"
| Height="12.75" | 374
 | Caecilia 43,44
 | Q.C.M.P.IMPER
 | 81
 | 81
 | Q. Caecilius Q.f. L.n. Metellus Pius
 | Cos. 80
|-   valign="bottom"
| Height="12.75" | 377
 | Volteia 6
 | L.VOL L.F STRAB
 | 81
 | 81
 | L. Volumnius L.f. Ani.
 | on the consilium of Pompey Strabo at Asculum
|-   valign="bottom"
| Height="12.75" | 378
 | Maria 7-9
 | C.MARI C.F CAPIT
 | 81
 | 81
 | C. Marius C.f. Capito
 | ?
|-   valign="bottom"
| Height="12.75" | 379
 | Procilia 1-2
 | L.PROCILI F
 | 80
 | 80
 | L. Procilius Filius
 | Senator 56
|-   valign="bottom"
| Height="12.75" | 380
 | Poblicia 9
 | C.POBLICI Q.F
 | 80
 | 80
 | C. Publicius Q.f.
 | ?
|-   valign="bottom"
| Height="12.75" | 381
 | Cornelia 46-7, Manlia 9-10
 | A.MANLI A.F Q
 | 80
 | 80
 | A. Manlius A.f. Q.n.
 | ?
|-   valign="bottom"
| Height="12.75" | 382
 | Naevia 6
 | C.NAE BALB
 | 79
 | 79
 | C. Naevius Balbus
 | ?
|-   valign="bottom"
| Height="12.75" | 383
 | Claudia 5
 | TI.CLAVD TI.F AP.N
 | 79
 | 79
 | Ti. Claudius Ti.f. Ap.n. Nero
 | Pr. before 63 or 67
|-   valign="bottom"
| Height="12.75" | 384
 | Papia 1
 | L.PAPI
 | 79
 | 79
 | L. Papius (Celsus)
 | Supposed father of the Monetalis of 45 
|}

 78-59 BC: Pompey, Lepidus to Caesar's first consulship 

 58-49 BC: Caesar in Gaul 

 49-44 BC: Crossing the Rubicon to the Ides of March 

{| class="wikitable" <hiddentext>generated with :de:Wikipedia:Helferlein/VBA-Macro for EXCEL tableconversion V14<\hiddentext>
|-   valign="bottom"
| width="40" Height="12.75" |RRC #| width="90" |Babelon #| width="200" |Inscription| width="30" |Start| width="30" |End| width="170" |Moneyer| width="120" |Career Highlight'''
|-   valign="bottom"
| Height="12.75" | 443
 | Julia 9
 | CAESAR
 | 49
 | 48
 | C. Julius C.f. C.n. Caesar
 | Cos I:59, II:48, II:46, IV:45, V:44
|-   valign="bottom"
| Height="12.75" | 444
 | Coponia 1-3
 | C.COPONIVS PR
 | 49
 | 49
 | C. Coponius
 | Pr. 49
|-   valign="bottom"
| Height="12.75" | 444
 | Sicinia 1-2, 4
 | Q.SICINIVS III.VIR
 | 49
 | 49
 | Q. Sicinius
 | ?
|-   valign="bottom"
| Height="12.75" | 445
 | Cornelia 64-67, Neria 2
 | L.LENTVLVS
 | 49
 | 49
 | L. Cornelius P.f. Lentulus Crus
 | Cos. 49
|-   valign="bottom"
| Height="12.75" | 445
 | Claudia 9-10
 | C.MARC COS
 | 49
 | 49
 | C. Claudius M.f. M.n. Marcellus
 | Cos. 49
|-   valign="bottom"
| Height="12.75" | 446
 | Pompeia 8
 | MAGN.PRO.COS
 | 49
 | 49
 | Cn. Pompeius Cn.f. Sex.n. Magnus
 | Cos. I:70, II:55, III:52
|-   valign="bottom"
| Height="12.75" | 446
 | Calpurnia 30
 | CN.PISO PROQ
 | 49
 | 49
 | Cn. Calpurnius Piso (Frugi?)
 | proQ. 49, Cos. Suff. 23
|-   valign="bottom"
| Height="12.75" | 447
 | Terentia 15
 | VARRO PRO.Q
 | 49
 | 49
 | M. Terentius Varro
 | proQ. 49, Spain
|-   valign="bottom"
| Height="12.75" | 447
 | Pompeia 7
 | MAGN.PRO.COS
 | 49
 | 49
 | Cn. Pompeius Cn.f. Sex.n. Magnus
 | Cos. I:70, II:55, III:52
|-   valign="bottom"
| Height="12.75" | 448
 | Hostilia 2, 4-5
 | L.HOSTILIVS SASERNA
 | 48
 | 48
 | L. Hostilius Saserna
 | ?
|-   valign="bottom"
| Height="12.75" | 449
 | Vibia 16-21
 | C.VIBIVS C.F C.N PANSA
 | 48
 | 48
 | C. Vibius C.f. C.n. Pansa Caetronianus
 | Cos. 43
|-   valign="bottom"
| Height="12.75" | 450
 | Junia 25-26, Postumia 10-11, 13-14
 | ALBINVS BRVTI F
 | 48
 | 48
 | D. Junius Brutus Albinus
 | Cos. Desig. 42
|-   valign="bottom"
| Height="12.75" | 451
 | Vibia 22
 | C.VIBIVS C.F C.N PANSA
 | 48
 | 48
 | C. Vibius C.f. C.n. Pansa Caetronianus
 | Cos. 43
|-   valign="bottom"
| Height="12.75" | 451
 | Junia27
 | ALBINVS BRVTI F
 | 48
 | 48
 | D. Junius Brutus Albinus
 | Cos. Desig. 42
|-   valign="bottom"
| Height="12.75" | 452
 | Julia 25-29
 | CAESAR
 | 48
 | 47
 | C. Julius C.f. C.n. Caesar
 | Cos I:59, II:48, II:46, IV:45, V:44
|-   valign="bottom"
| Height="12.75" | 453
 | Plautia 14-15
 | L.PLAVTIVS PLANCVS
 | 47
 | 47
 | L. Plautius Plancus
 | Pr. 43
|-   valign="bottom"
| Height="12.75" | 454
 | Licinia 23-27
 | A.LICINI NERVA III VIR
 | 47
 | 47
 | A. Licinius Nerva
 | ?
|-   valign="bottom"
| Height="12.75" | 455
 | Antia 1-6
 | C.ANTIVS C.F RESTIO
 | 47
 | 47
 | C. Antius C.f. Restio
 | proscribed 43
|-   valign="bottom"
| Height="12.75" | 456
 | Julia 15
 | CAESAR DICT ITER
 | 47
 | 46
 | C. Julius C.f. C.n. Caesar
 | Cos I:59, II:48, II:46, IV:45, V:44
|-   valign="bottom"
| Height="12.75" | 457
 | Alliena 1
 | A. ALLIENVS PRO.COS
 | 47
 | 47
 | A. Allienus
 | Q. ca. 62, Tr. Pl. 55, Pr. 49, proCos. 47
|-   valign="bottom"
| Height="12.75" | 457
 | Julia 14
 | CAESAR
 | 47
 | 47
 | C. Julius C.f. C.n. Caesar
 | Cos I:59, II:48, II:46, IV:45, V:44
|-   valign="bottom"
| Height="12.75" | 458
 | Julia 10
 | CAESAR
 | 47
 | 47
 | C. Julius C.f. C.n. Caesar
 | Cos I:59, II:48, II:46, IV:45, V:44
|-   valign="bottom"
| Height="12.75" | 459
 | Caecilia 47
 | Q.METEL.PIVS SCIPIO IMP
 | 47
 | 46
 | Q. Caecilius Q.f. Q.n. Metellus Pius Scipio Nasica
 | Tr. Pl. 59, Aed. 57, Pr. 55, Cos. 52
|-   valign="bottom"
| Height="12.75" | 460
 | Caecilia 48-49, 51-52
 | Q.METEL.PIVS SCIPIO IMP
 | 47
 | 46
 | Q. Caecilius Q.f. Q.n. Metellus Pius Scipio Nasica
 | Tr. Pl. 59, Aed. 57, Pr. 55, Cos. 52
|-   valign="bottom"
| Height="12.75" | 460
 | Licinia 19-22
 | P.CRASSUS IVN.LEG.PRO.PR
 | 47
 | 46
 | P. Licinius Crassus Iunianus
 | Tr. Pl. 53, Leg., Propr. 47
|-   valign="bottom"
| Height="12.75" | 461
 | Caecilia 50
 | Q.METEL.PIVS SCIPIO IMP
 | 47
 | 46
 | Q. Caecilius Q.f. Q.n. Metellus Pius Scipio Nasica
 | Cos. 52
|-   valign="bottom"
| Height="12.75" | 461
 | Eppia 1
 | EPPIUS LEG.F.C
 | 47
 | 46
 | M. Eppius
 | Q. 52, Legatus fisci castrensis 46, Leg. 44
|-   valign="bottom"
| Height="12.75" | 462
 | Porcia 9-11
 | M.CATO PRO.PR
 | 47
 | 46
 | M. Porcius Cato (Uticensis)
 | Tr. Mil 67—66, Tr. Pl. 62, Pr. de repetundis 54, Propr. 47—46
|-   valign="bottom"
| Height="12.75" | 463
 | Cordia 1-9
 | MN.CORDIVS RVFVS IIIVIR
 | 46
 | 46
 | Mn. Cordius Rufus
 | ?
|-   valign="bottom"
| Height="12.75" | 464
 | Carisia 1-13
 | T.CARISIVS IIIVIR
 | 46
 | 46
 | T. Carisius
 | ?
|-   valign="bottom"
| Height="12.75" | 465
 | Considia 2-11
 | C.CONSIDI PAETI
 | 46
 | 46
 | C. Considius Paetus
 | The adopted son G. Considius Longus
|-   valign="bottom"
| Height="12.75" | 466
 | Julia 22-23
 | C.CAESAR COS.TER
 | 46
 | 46
 | C. Julius C.f. C.n. Caesar
 | Cos I:59, II:48, II:46, IV:45, V:44
|-   valign="bottom"
| Height="12.75" | 466
 | Hirtia 1-2
 | A.HIRTIVS PR
 | 46
 | 46
 | A. Hirtius
 | Tr. Pl. 48, Pr. 46, Cos. 43
|-   valign="bottom"
| Height="12.75" | 467
 | Julia 16
 | COS.TERT DICT.ITER AVGVR PONT.MAX
 | 46
 | 46
 | C. Julius C.f. C.n. Caesar
 | Cos I:59, II:48, II:46, IV:45, V:44
|-   valign="bottom"
| Height="12.75" | 468
 | Julia 11-12
 | CAESAR
 | 46
 | 45
 | C. Julius C.f. C.n. Caesar
 | Cos I:59, II:48, II:46, IV:45, V:44
|-   valign="bottom"
| Height="12.75" | 469
 | Pompeia 9
 | CN.MAGNVS IMP
 | 46
 | 45
 | Cn. Pompeius Cn.f. Cn.n. Magnus
 | Imp 46-45
|-   valign="bottom"
| Height="12.75" | 469
 | Poblicia 10
 | M.POBLICI LEG.PRO PR
 | 46
 | 45
 | M. Publicius
 | Leg., Propr. 46—45
|-   valign="bottom"
| Height="12.75" | 470
 | Pompeia 10-12,14
 | CN. MAGNVS IMP.F
 | 46
 | 45
 | Cn. Pompeius Cn.f. Cn.n. Magnus
 | Imp 46-45
|-   valign="bottom"
| Height="12.75" | 470
 | Minatia 1-3,5
 | M. MINAT.SABIN.PR.Q
 | 46
 | 45
 | M. Minatius Sabinus
 | ProQ. 46-5
|-   valign="bottom"
| Height="12.75" | 471
 | Pompeia 15
 | CN.MAG.IMP
 | 46
 | 45
 | Cn. Pompeius Cn.f. Cn.n. Magnus
 | Imp 46-45
|-   valign="bottom"
| Height="12.75" | 472
 | Papia 2-7
 | L.PAPIVS CELSVS III VIR
 | 45
 | 45
 | L. Papius L.f. Celsus
 | Supposed son of the Monetalis of 79
|-   valign="bottom"
| Height="12.75" | 473
 | Lollia 1-4
 | PALIKANVS
 | 45
 | 45
 | ? Lollius M.f. Palicanus
 | ?
|-   valign="bottom"
| Height="12.75" | 474
 | Valeria 14-23
 | L.VALERIVS ACISCVLVS
 | 45
 | 45
 | L. Valerius Acisculus
 | Tr. Pl. ?
|-   valign="bottom"
| Height="12.75" | 475
 | Munatia 1-3
 | L.PLANC.PRAEF.VRB
 | 45
 | 45
 | L. Plancius
 | Praef Urb. 45
|-   valign="bottom"
| Height="12.75" | 475
 | Julia 18-20
 | C.CAES.DIC.TER
 | 45
 | 45
 | C. Julius C.f. C.n. Caesar
 | Cos I:59, II:48, II:46, IV:45, V:44
|-   valign="bottom"
| Height="12.75" | 476
 | Clovia 11
 | C.CLOVI PRAEF
 | 45
 | 45
 | C. Cluvius
 | Praef. Cisalpine Gaul 46—45
|-   valign="bottom"
| Height="12.75" | 476
 | Julia 17
 | CAESAR DIC.TER
 | 45
 | 45
 | C. Julius C.f. C.n. Caesar
 | Cos I:59, II:48, II:46, IV:45, V:44
|-   valign="bottom"
| Height="12.75" | 477
 | Pompeia 16-18
 | SEX.MAGNVS PIVS IMP
 | 45
 | 45
 | Sex. Pompeius Cn.f. Cn.n. Magnus Pius
 | Imp 46-45, Cos. Desig 35
|-   valign="bottom"
| Height="12.75" | 478
 | Pompeia 19
 | MAGNVS PIVS IMP. F
 | 45
 | 44
 | Sex. Pompeius Cn.f. Cn.n. Magnus Pius
 | Imp 46-45, Cos. Desig 35
|-   valign="bottom"
| Height="12.75" | 478
 | Eppia 2,4
 | EPPIVS LEG
 | 45
 | 44
 | Eppius
 | ?
|-   valign="bottom"
| Height="12.75" | 479
 | Pompeia 20
 | MAGNVS PIVS IMP
 | 45
 | ?
 | Sex. Pompeius Cn.f. Cn.n. Magnus Pius
 | Imp 46-45, Cos. Desig 35
|-   valign="bottom"
| Height="12.75" | 480/1
 | Julia 38, Aemilia 12
 | L.BVCA
 | 44
 | 44
 | L. Aemilius Buca
 | ?
|-   valign="bottom"
| Height="12.75" | 480/2
 | Julia 31, Mettia 3
 | M.METTIVS CAESAR.DICT.QVART
 | 44
 | 44
 | M. Mettius
 | ?
|-   valign="bottom"
| Height="12.75" | 480/3
 | Julia 32, Mettia 4
 | M.METTIUS CAESAR IMP
 | 44
 | 44
 | M. Mettius
 | ?
|-   valign="bottom"
| Height="12.75" | 480/4
 | Julia 34, Aemilia 13
 | CAESAR.IM P M L. AEMILIVS BVCA
 | 44
 | 44
 | L. Aemilius Buca
 | ?
|-   valign="bottom"
| Height="12.75" | 480/5
 | Julia 46, Sepullia 1
 | CAESAR IMP P.SEPVLLIVS MACER
 | 44
 | 44
 | P. Sepullius Macer
 | ?
|-   valign="bottom"
| Height="12.75" | 480/6
 | Julia 37, Aemilia 17
 | L.BVCA CAESAR.DICT PERPETVO
 | 44
 | 44
 | L. Aemilius Buca
 | ?
|-   valign="bottom"
| Height="12.75" | 480/7
 | Julia 36, Aemilia 15,16
 | L.BVCA CAESAR.DICT PERPETVO
 | 44
 | 44
 | L. Aemilius Buca
 | ?
|-   valign="bottom"
| Height="12.75" | 480/8
 | Julia 35, Aemilia 14
 | L.BVCA
 | 44
 | 44
 | L. Aemilius Buca
 | ?
|-   valign="bottom"
| Height="12.75" | 480/9
 | N/A
 | CAESAR IMP P.SEPVLLIVS MACER
 | 44
 | 44
 | P. Sepullius Macer
 | ?
|-   valign="bottom"
| Height="12.75" | 480/10
 | Julia 48, Sepullia 3
 | CAESAR IMP P.SEPVLLIVS MACER
 | 44
 | 44
 | P. Sepullius Macer
 | ?
|-   valign="bottom"
| Height="12.75" | 480/11
 | Julia 49, Sepullia 4
 | CAESAR IMP P.SEPVLLIVS MACER
 | 44
 | 44
 | P. Sepullius Macer
 | ?
|-   valign="bottom"
| Height="12.75" | 480/12
 | N/A
 | CAESAR DICT.PERPETVO P.SEPVLLIVS MACER
 | 44
 | 44
 | P. Sepullius Macer
 | ?
|-   valign="bottom"
| Height="12.75" | 480/13
 | Julia 50, Sepullia 5
 | CAESAR DICT.PERPETVO P.SEPVLLIVS MACER
 | 44
 | 44
 | P. Sepullius Macer
 | ?
|-   valign="bottom"
| Height="12.75" | 480/14
 | N/A
 | CAESAR DICT.PERPETVO P.SEPVLLIVS MACER
 | 44
 | 44
 | P. Sepullius Macer
 | ?
|-   valign="bottom"
| Height="12.75" | 480/15
 | Julia 42, Cossutia 4
 | CAESAR DICT.IN.PERPETVO C.COSSVTIVS MARIDIANVS
 | 44
 | 44
 | C. Cossutius Maridianus
 | ?
|-   valign="bottom"
| Height="12.75" | 480/16
 | Julia 41, Cossutia 3
 | CAESAR DICT.IN.PERPETVO C.COSSVTIVS MARIDIANVS
 | 44
 | 44
 | C. Cossutius Maridianus
 | ?
|-   valign="bottom"
| Height="12.75" | 480/17
 | Julia 33, Mettia 5
 | CAESAR IMPER M.METTIVS
 | 44
 | 44
 | M. Mettius
 | ?
|-   valign="bottom"
| Height="12.75" | 480/18
 | Julia 47, Sepullia 2
 | CAESAR IMPER P.SEPVLLIVS MACER
 | 44
 | 44
 | P. Sepullius Macer
 | ?
|-   valign="bottom"
| Height="12.75" | 480/19
 | Julia 43, Cossutia 2
 | CAESAR PARENS.PATRIAE C.COSSVTIVS MARIDIANVS AAAFF
 | 44
 | 44
 | C. Cossutius Maridianus
 | ?
|-   valign="bottom"
| Height="12.75" | 480/20
 | Julia 51, Sepullia 6
 | CAESAR PARENS.PATRIAE P.SEPVLLIVS MACER
 | 44
 | 44
 | P. Sepullius Macer
 | ?
|-   valign="bottom"
| Height="12.75" | 480/21
 | Julia 52, Sepullia 7
 | CLEMENTIAE CAESARIS P.SEPVLLIVS MACER
 | 44
 | 44
 | P. Sepullius Macer
 | ?
|-   valign="bottom"
| Height="12.75" | 480/22
 | Antonia 2, Sepullia 8
 | P.SEPVLLIVS MACER
 | 44
 | 44
 | P. Sepullius Macer
 | ?
|-   valign="bottom"
| Height="12.75" | 480/23
 | Mettia 1
 | M.METTI
 | 44
 | 44
 | M. Mettius
 | ?
|-   valign="bottom"
| Height="12.75" | 480/24
 | Aemilia 18, Julia 39
 | L.AEMILIVS.BVCA.IIIVIR
 | 44
 | 44
 | L. Aemilius Buca
 | ?
|-   valign="bottom"
| Height="12.75" | 480/25
 | Sepullia 9
 | P.SEPVLLIVS MACER
 | 44
 | 44
 | P. Sepullius Macer
 | ?
|-   valign="bottom"
| Height="12.75" | 480/26
 | Aemilia 19, Julia 40
 | L.AEMILIVS.BVCA
 | 44
 | 44
 | L. Aemilius Buca
 | ?
|-   valign="bottom"
| Height="12.75" | 480/27
 | Sepullia 11-12
 | P.SEPVLLIVS
 | 44
 | 44
 | P. Sepullius Macer
 | ?
|-   valign="bottom"
| Height="12.75" | 480/28
 | Mettia 2
 | M.METTI
 | 44
 | 44
 | M. Mettius
 | ?
|}

 44-42 BC: From the Ides of March to Philippi 

 42-31 BC: Philippi to Actium 

 See also 
 List of Roman consuls

 References 

 Bibliography 
 Babelon, Ernest (1885-6). Description historique et chronologique des monnaies de la république romaine, 2 Volumes.
 Broughton, T. Robert S. (1951). The Magistrates of the Roman Republic, American Philological Association, 3 Volumes. Volume I (509 B.C. - 100 B.C.)  . Volume II (99 B.C. - 31 B.C.) Philological Monographs Number XV, 1952. Volume III (Supplement) .
 Burnett, Andrew (1977). "The Authority to Coin in the Late Republic and Early Empire", Numismatic Chronicle, Seventh Series 17 pp. 37–63.
 Burnett, Andrew (1987). Coinage in the Roman World, Seaby. 
 Crawford, Michael H. (1974). Roman Republican Coinage, Cambridge University Press, 2 Volumes. 
 Hamilton, Charles D. (1969),The Tresviri Monetales and the Republican Cursus Honorum, Transactions and Proceedings of the American Philological Association, 100 pp 181–199.
 Harlan, Michael (1996). Roman Republican Moneyers and their Coins 63 BC-49 BC, Trafalgar Square Publishing.  {
 Hornblower, Simon & Spaworth, Antony (1999). The Oxford Classical Dictionary. Third Edition. 
 Melville Jones, John R., (1990), A Dictionary of Ancient Roman Coins, Seaby. 
 Luce, T.J. (1968). "Political Propaganda on Roman Republican Coins: Circa 92-82 B. C.", American Journal of Archaeology 72'(1), pp. 25–39.
 Sear, David R. (1998). The History and Coinage of the Roman Imperators 49-27 B.C., Spink & Son. 
 Smith, William (1875). A Dictionary of Greek and Roman Antiquities, John Murray, London.
 Stevenson, Seth William (1889). A Dictionary of Roman Coins, Republican and Imperial, George Bell and Sons, London.
 Wiseman, T.P. (1971). New Men in the Roman Senate 139 B.C. - A.D. 14'', Oxford University Press, 

Moneyers
Economy of ancient Rome